Basile Salomon Pereira de Carvalho (born 31 October 1981) is a Senegalese-born Bissau-Guinean former professional footballer who played as a forward. In 2011 and 2012 he made six FIFA-official appearances, scoring twice for the Guinea-Bissau national team.

Career

France
De Carvalho was born in Ziguinchor, Senegal. He joined the French club Louhans-Cuiseaux in 2000, and scored 15 goals in 38 games across two seasons there. Between 2002 and 2004, he played for Sochaux, with a one-year period out on loan to Sedan. De Carvalho then spent five years between 2005 and 2010 with Brest in Ligue 2 and Championnat National. In the beginning of 2010, he signed for Strasbourg in Championnat National, scoring once in 15 matches.

Lokomotiv Plovdiv
In 2010, De Carvalho joined Lokomotiv Plovdiv as a replacement for Garra Dembele, who had just been sold to Levski Sofia. In six months there, he scored 7 goals in 13 matches. In January 2011, De Carvalho was close to being transferred to Levski Sofia, but the deal eventually fell through, purportedly due to his chronic shoulder problems. He continued to be a regular starter for Lokomotiv Plovdiv, when physically fit, during the 2011–12 season. On 15 March 2012, De Carvalho was sent off after an altercation with Hristo Yovov in the quarter-final of the Bulgarian Cup, which his team eventually won 2–1 after extra time.

Levski Sofia
On 12 June 2012, De Carvalho signed with Levski Sofia on a two-year deal. He made his competitive debut on 19 July, in a 1–0 home win over FK Sarajevo in a UEFA Europa League match, and scored his first goal (converting a penalty kick) in the return leg against the same opponent, which was lost by a score of 1–3.

On 28 November, Basile netted his first A Group hat-trick in a 7–1 home win against Etar 1924, scoring four goals. He became the first foreigner to score four goals in a one match for Levski. He finished the 2012–13 A Group season as the top goalscorer in the league, having found the net 19 times in total. His European campaign was somewhat less successful, as he missed a penalty in the first leg of a UEFA Europa League match against Kazakh team Irtysh Pavlodar; his team was eventually eliminated 2–0 on aggregate.

White Star
On 20 July 2013, De Carvalho relocated to Belgium, signing a contract with second division club White Star Bruxelles. He made his official debut (as a starter) on 4 August 2013, scoring an equalizing goal in the 2–1 home win over Geel.

Inter Luanda
In July 2014, De Carvalho moved to Angola, signing a contract with top division club Inter Luanda.

Louhans-Cuiseaux
In January 2015, De Carvalho relocated to France, signing a contract with third division club Louhans-Cuiseaux, where he had started his career in Europe. In May 2019, he announced his retirement from football.

International career
In September 2010, De Carvalho was called up to the national team of Guinea Bissau for the 2012 African Cup of Nations qualifiers. His debut came on 26 March 2011, in a 0–1 home loss against Uganda in a 2012 African Nations Cup qualifier.
On 10 August 2011, he opened his account for the national side, scoring twice in the 4–1 win against Equatorial Guinea in a friendly match. These two goals are not considered official due to the nature of the friendly game and are not listed below. De Carvalho participated in Guinea-Bissau's qualifying campaign for the 2014 World Cup.

Personal life
He also holds French citizenship.

Career statistics

Club

International goals
Scores and results list Guinea-Bissau's goal tally first, score column indicates score after each de Carvalho goal.

References

External links

 Profile at LevskiSofia.info

1981 births
Living people
People from Ziguinchor
Senegalese people of Bissau-Guinean descent
Senegalese footballers
Citizens of Guinea-Bissau through descent
Bissau-Guinean footballers
Guinea-Bissau international footballers
Bissau-Guinean expatriate footballers
Bissau-Guinean expatriate sportspeople in France
Bissau-Guinean expatriate sportspeople in Bulgaria
Bissau-Guinean expatriate sportspeople in Belgium

Expatriate footballers in France
Ligue 1 players
Ligue 2 players
FC Sochaux-Montbéliard players
CS Sedan Ardennes players
Stade Brestois 29 players
RC Strasbourg Alsace players
PFC Lokomotiv Plovdiv players
PFC Levski Sofia players
RWS Bruxelles players
First Professional Football League (Bulgaria) players
Expatriate footballers in Bulgaria
Association football forwards